Education in Punjab may refer to:

 Education in Punjab (India)
 Punjab (Pakistan)#Education